Mike Pawley  (born 10 March 1944), also known as Mick Pawley,  is an Australian former professional cricketer, philanthropist and business owner. He played 11 first-class cricket matches for New South Wales between 1969/70 and 1973/74.

Pawley owns a chain of local sports stores, Mike Pawley Sports, with five stores across Sydney’s Northern Beaches. He founded and runs the Happy Days Cambodian Village School Charity. Mike Pawley Oval in North Curl Curl is named after him.

Pawley studied a for Bachelor of Science degree and Diploma of Education at Sydney University. He was awarded the Order of Australia Medal in 2011 and is a life member of Cricket NSW.

References

External links
 

1944 births
Living people
Australian cricketers
New South Wales cricketers
Australian philanthropists